José Jorge de Viteri y Ungo (24 April 1802 – 25 July 1853) was a Roman Catholic bishop who served as the first Bishop of San Salvador from 1843 until 1849, when he was appointed as Bishop of Nicaragua until his death in 1853.

References 

1802 births
1853 deaths
19th-century Roman Catholic bishops in El Salvador
Roman Catholic bishops of San Salvador